Adam Fox may refer to:

Adam Fox (poet) (1883–1977), British poet
Adam Fox (professor), British allergist
Adam Fox (ice hockey) (born 1998), American ice hockey player
Adam Fox, American convicted conspirator in the Gretchen Whitmer kidnapping plot